"Give Me One More Shot" is a song written by Randy Owen, Teddy Gentry and Ronnie Rogers, and recorded by American country music group Alabama.  It was released in February 1995 as the second and final single from their compilation album Greatest Hits Vol. III.  It peaked at number 3 in both the United States and Canada.

Critical reception
Deborah Evans Price, of Billboard magazine reviewed the song favorably, saying that "longtime fans of this venerable band will fall in love with this midtempo number and its upbeat, one-day-at-a-time message." She goes on to say that the hooks "are strong enough to reel in a few of the skeptics out there."

Content
The song's narrator wants another shot and one more day as he struggles through life, including taxes.

Chart performance
"Give Me One More Shot" debuted at number 56 on the U.S. Billboard Hot Country Singles & Tracks for the week of February 11, 1995.

Year-end charts

References

1994 songs
Alabama (American band) songs
1995 singles
Songs written by Teddy Gentry
Songs written by Randy Owen
Songs written by Ronnie Rogers
Song recordings produced by Garth Fundis
RCA Records Nashville singles